The John Cooper School is an independent, college-preparatory, nonsectarian, co-educational day school located in The Woodlands, an unincorporated planned community in Montgomery County, Texas, United States.

Overview
The John Cooper School is an independent, college-preparatory, day school for students in prekindergarten through grade 12. Cooper currently enrolls 510 students in the Upper School (9-12), 314 in the Middle School (6-8) and 492 in the Lower School (PK-5) for a total enrollment of 1,316.

History
The John Cooper School was funded by corporate and private benefactors, parents, and other supporters in The Woodlands and the Houston metropolitan area. It was named in honor of Mr. John Cooper, the long-tenured Headmaster of Houston's Kinkaid School, who guided the school through its original formation and early years of operation.

Cooper officially opened on September 6, 1988, on a 43-acre campus designated for this purpose by the principal founder of The Woodlands, businessman and philanthropist George P. Mitchell.

The School began with an enrollment of 175 students in Pre-Kindergarten through Grade 7, and one additional grade level was added each successive year. The first senior class graduated in 1994.  The opening enrollment of 1,316 students for the 2022–23 academic year represents the school's largest ever student body.

In 2015, Cooper's headmaster Mike Maher stated that the opening of ExxonMobil's offices in north Harris County will increase demand for The John Cooper School.

In 2021, Dr. Stephen Popp was named as the new head of school starting in the 2022-23 school year. Dr. Popp previously served as the Upper School Headmaster and Assistant Head of School

Campus
The campus has expanded in conjunction with the School's steadily growing student body. A new middle and upper school building for academics was opened in 1992. Additions over the past 10 years include expansion to facilitate new PK classrooms and a PK playground, additional science and computer labs, a second gymnasium, a Student Center and lighted facilities for track and field, soccer, softball and baseball.

The 38,000-square-foot Glenn Performing Arts Center opened in August, 2008, and features a 515-seat main stage theater, 125-seat black box theater and choir, drama, band and dance classrooms. A new Upper School Library, Middle/Upper School Health Center, and four additional classrooms were added in 2011 in addition to the Pugh Football Field. A new 16,500-square-foot Lower School 5th Grade classroom facility opened to the Lower School Student and Faculty Body for the 2013-2014 school year. In August 2016, the school opened the 45,000-square-foot Rock Math + Science Center which houses Middle and Upper School math, science, and computer science classes. A new, 4,250-square-foot Lower School library building opened in spring of 2018, and the former library was renovated to consolidate administrative offices.

Accreditation
A non-profit corporation governed by a Board of Trustees, Cooper earned its first accreditation by the Independent Schools Association of the Southwest (ISAS) in 1998. That accreditation was renewed again in 2008 and 2018. The School also holds memberships in the National Association of Independent Schools (NAIS), the National Association for College Admission Counseling (NACAC), the Council for Advancement and Support of Education (CASE), the College Entrance Examination Board (CEEB), the Educational Records Bureau (ERB), and the Cum Laude Society of America.

The Academic Program
Academics include English, mathematics, science, social sciences, world languages, computer science, physical education, visual and performing arts. Spanish is offered PK through Grade 12 and French is offered beginning in the sixth grade. 21 advanced placement courses are offered to Upper School students, and The John Cooper School has been recognized by being nominated for the prestigious Siemens Advanced Placement High School Award for having one of the strongest AP math and science programs in the state.

Athletics and Extracurricular Activities
Over 75 percent of Cooper's Middle and Upper School students participate in at least one sport. Students choose to compete in girls volleyball and softball, boys football and baseball, and boys and girls cross country, soccer, basketball, track, tennis, swimming, and golf. Varsity teams compete in the highly regarded Southwest Preparatory Conference that comprises 18 independent schools in Texas and Oklahoma. Most recently, the football team won the SPC championship in November 2021. The Middle School teams participate in the Houston Junior Preparatory Conference.

Extensive club, service, and leadership opportunities are offered at all grade levels. The school community contributes to the greater community through a wide variety club and service projects in all divisions as well as school-wide efforts such as the Habitat for Humanity Project that has partially funded and constructed Habitat homes each year since 1999, the Empty Bowls Project held each February to support and fund local hunger relief efforts, and the Dig Pink week held each October to raise funds and awareness for breast cancer. The Cooper Dig Pink fundraiser raised the most money in the nation in both 2015 and 2016. Additionally, the school has an active chapter of the student run civic organization Junior State of America. Each year the Cooper chapter is one of the largest in Texas and has had many students involved on a state and national level through elections and leadership conferences.

Cooper graduates have 100 percent college matriculation and are accepted to top colleges and universities, nationally and internationally. Seven students from the class of 2017 were named National Merit Semifinalists.

Notable alumni
 Mallory Bechtel — Broadway, Zoe Murphy in Dear Evan Hansen
 Coby Cotton — YouTuber from the channel Dude Perfect
 Cory Cotton — YouTuber from the channel Dude Perfect
 Rachel Stelter — Professional National Women's Soccer League soccer player

References

External links

 

Independent Schools Association of the Southwest
Private K-12 schools in Texas
Private schools in Greater Houston
Schools in Montgomery County, Texas
High schools in Montgomery County, Texas
Preparatory schools in Texas
Educational institutions established in 1988
1988 establishments in Texas